Willyan da Silva Rocha (born 27 January 1995) is a Brazilian footballer who plays as a central defender for Russian club CSKA Moscow.

Club career

Early career
Born in Muniz Freire, Espírito Santo, Rocha joined Desportiva Ferroviária's youth setup at the age of seven. On 13 January 2015, he was loaned to the under-20 side of Flamengo for one year.

Rocha returned to Desportiva after Flamengo could not reach an agreement for a permanent transfer, and scored a brace in a friendly against Botafogo on 23 January 2016. He featured regularly during the year's Campeonato Capixaba, and moved to Grêmio on 24 July, after not renewing his contract.

On 8 December 2016, Rocha was loaned to Votuporanguense until the end of the 2017 Campeonato Paulista Série A2. He scored his only goal for the club in a 2–0 home win against Mogi Mirim on 2 April.

Cova da Piedade
On 3 July 2017, Rocha moved abroad and signed a two-year contract with Portuguese LigaPro club Cova da Piedade. He was an undisputed starter for the club, only missing out the first half of the 2018–19 campaign due to injury.

Portimonense
On 28 June 2019, Rocha signed a four-year deal with Primeira Liga side Portimonense. He made his debut in the category on 9 August, starting in a 0–0 home draw against Belenenses SAD.

Rocha scored his first goal in the Portuguese top tier on 16 June 2020, netting the opener in a 1–1 away draw against Santa Clara.

CSKA Moscow
On 1 September 2022, CSKA Moscow announced the signing of Rocha on a contract until the summer of 2025, with the option of an additional year.

Career statistics

Honours
Desportiva Ferroviária
Campeonato Capixaba: 2016

References

External links

1995 births
Living people
Sportspeople from Espírito Santo
Brazilian footballers
Association football defenders
Desportiva Ferroviária players
Grêmio Foot-Ball Porto Alegrense players
Clube Atlético Votuporanguense players
C.D. Cova da Piedade players
Portimonense S.C. players
PFC CSKA Moscow players
Campeonato Brasileiro Série D players
Liga Portugal 2 players
Primeira Liga players
Russian Premier League players
Brazilian expatriate footballers
Brazilian expatriate sportspeople in Portugal
Expatriate footballers in Portugal
Brazilian expatriate sportspeople in Russia
Expatriate footballers in Russia